Tore Onshuus Sandvik (born 31 August 1969) is a Norwegian politician. Since 2018, he has been Chairman of the County Council of Trøndelag.

Biography
Sandvik grew up at Kolstad in Trondheim and was as a young adult County Youth Secretary in the Norwegian Confederation of Trade Unions and later Vice President of ETUC Youth. In 2001 he was appointed State Secretary of the Norwegian Ministry of Trade and Industry. Before he was elected County Mayor in 2003 he also worked as a project director for Extend. He was reelected in the 2007, 2011 and 2015 elections.

References

1969 births
Living people
Politicians from Trondheim
Norwegian state secretaries
Labour Party (Norway) politicians
Sør-Trøndelag politicians
Chairmen of County Councils of Norway